Stephen Nash (born July 5, 1985) is a Canadian volleyball player.

Sporting achievements 
Swedish Championship:
  2010, 2014
Baltic League:
  2012
Estonian Championship:
  2012
MEVZA:
  2015
Austrian Championship:
  2015

References

External links
LegaVolley profile
Volleybox profile
CEV profile

1985 births
Living people
Canadian men's volleyball players
Sportspeople from Calgary
Canadian expatriate sportspeople in Austria
Expatriate volleyball players in Austria
Canadian expatriate sportspeople in France
Expatriate volleyball players in France
Canadian expatriate sportspeople in Greece
Expatriate volleyball players in Greece
Canadian expatriate sportspeople in Sweden
Expatriate volleyball players in Estonia
Canadian expatriate sportspeople in Qatar
Expatriate volleyball players in Qatar
Canadian expatriate sportspeople in Italy
Expatriate volleyball players in Italy
Canadian expatriate sportspeople in Indonesia
Expatriate volleyball players in Indonesia
Opposite hitters